Hypocaccus brasiliensis is a species of clown beetle in the family Histeridae. It is found in Africa, Europe and Northern Asia (excluding China), Central America, South America, and Southern Asia.

References

Further reading

 

Histeridae
Articles created by Qbugbot
Beetles described in 1811